Cedar Island Light is a lighthouse in Cedar Point County Park in East Hampton, New York.  It overlooks Gardiners Bay.

History
The  granite lighthouse was decommissioned in 1934 and replaced by an automatic light on a steel skeleton at breakwater.  The lighthouse, built in the Italianate style, is listed on the National Register of Historic Places.

Cultural
The Archives Center at the Smithsonian National Museum of American History has a collection (#1055) of souvenir postcards of lighthouses and has digitized 272 of these and made them available online.  These include postcards of Cedar Island Light with links to customized nautical charts provided by National Oceanographic and Atmospheric Administration.

References

External links
 
 
 Cedar Island Lighthouse - from Lighthousefriends.com
 Suffolk County Park Site
 National Park Service List of New York Lighthouses
 U. S. Lighthouse Society’s The Keeper’s Log – Winter, 2007

Lighthouses completed in 1839
East Hampton (town), New York
Lighthouses on the National Register of Historic Places in New York (state)
Lighthouses in Suffolk County, New York
Tourist attractions in Suffolk County, New York
National Register of Historic Places in Suffolk County, New York
Italianate architecture in New York (state)
1839 establishments in New York (state)